Isaac Kissi (born May 14, 1987, in Brong-Ahafo) is a Ghanaian footballer.

Career

College and Amateur
Kiss attended the Presbyterian Boys Secondary School in his native Ghana, and studied for two years at the University of Ghana, before accepting a soccer scholarship with the University of Dayton in the United States in 2007. He subsequently played three years of college soccer with the Flyers; he was selected to the Atlantic 10 All-Championship Team and the UNCW Courtyard by Marriott All-Tournament Team as a sophomore in 2008.

Professional
Kissi was drafted in the third round (42nd overall) of the 2010 MLS SuperDraft by Chivas USA but was not offered a contract by the team and was cut before the season started.

He subsequently signed with the Rochester Rhinos, and made his professional debut on May 19, 2010, in a game against Crystal Palace Baltimore. He scored his first two professional goals on June 12, 2010, in a 2–1 win, again over Crystal Palace Baltimore. Rochester re-signed Kissi for the 2012 season, which will be his third with the club, on October 25, 2011.

Honors

Rochester Rhinos
USSF Division 2 Pro League Regular Season Champions (1): 2010

References

External links
 Rochester Rhinos bio
 Dayton bio

1987 births
Living people
Ghanaian footballers
Ghanaian expatriate footballers
Rochester New York FC players
Dayton Flyers men's soccer players
USSF Division 2 Professional League players
USL Championship players
Chivas USA draft picks
Association football forwards
Presbyterian Boys' Senior High School alumni